Farther Away may refer to:

 Farther Away (book), a 2012 essay collection by Jonathan Franzen
 "Farther Way" (song), a song by Evanescence from Anywhere but Home

See also 
 Alejandro Selkirk Island, previously known as Más Afuera (Farther Away), a Chilean island